Kristen Barnhisel is an American winemaker. She is Quality Control manager at Inglenook. She specializes in making pinot noir and Cabernet Sauvignon wines.

Personal life and education

Kristen Barnhisel was raised in Santa Rosa, California in the United States. Her mother was a microbiologist who worked at Simi Winery. Her father made wine at the family home. Barnhisel attended the University of California, San Diego. While in school, she studied Italian literature and biology. She also attended the University of California, Davis, where she obtained her master's degree in enology.

Career

Barnhisel worked at Ruffino in Italy, making her the first woman and first American to work there during harvest season. She has worked at wineries in California, Washington, and South Africa. In 1997, she started as enologist at Columbia Crest. She also worked at Jordan Vineyard & Winery and Belvedere. She started working at Handley Cellars in 2004. She worked as co-winemaker with Milla Handley   until 2012. She is currently the Quality Control Manager for Inglenook.  Barnhisel currently serves as a director for the American Society for Enology and Viticulture.

Further reading

Barnhisel, Kristen. Evaluation of Five Merlot Clones in the Napa Valley Over Two Vintages. Davis: University of California (1998).

References

External links
The Pioneer Queen of Anderson Valley Pinot, an interview with Milla Handley and Kristen Barnhisel from Wine Spectator

American winemakers
American women scientists
People from Santa Rosa, California
University of California, San Diego alumni
University of California, Davis alumni
Living people
Year of birth missing (living people)
21st-century American women